= Citygate Bradford =

Coordinates: 53°47′13.0″N 1°45′13.1″W

Citygate was a c. 2007 scheme to build the tallest building in Bradford and joint tallest building in Yorkshire, on a site on Manchester Road. The developer went into administration in 2008 and in 2010 the site was acquired by the Skelwith Group, which has announced proposals for an initial development phase of more than 700 apartments.

The Aspire Citygate firm (trading under Bradford Developments) went into administration in January 2016, so the £45 million scheme has stalled despite work starting in 2012 on site.
